Tien Chung-kwang is a Taiwanese politician who has served as a Deputy Minister of Foreign Affairs of Taiwan since 24 July 2020.

Education
Tien obtained his bachelor's degree in English literature from Fu Jen Catholic University.

References

Living people
Fu Jen Catholic University alumni
Representatives of Taiwan to India
Taiwanese Ministers of Foreign Affairs
Year of birth missing (living people)